The Ligier JS9 was a Formula One racing car manufactured and raced by Ligier during the 1978 Formula One season. Driven by Frenchman Jacques Laffite, its best finish was third (twice).

Development
The JS9 was designed by Gérard Ducarouge and Michel Beaujon, with Robert Choulet working on aerodynamics. The JS9 had a large rear wing, but did not use the ground effects aerodynamics that was being developed by Lotus and other teams. The Hewland TL200 gearbox of the previous year was upgraded to the more lightweight Hewland FGA 6-speed and it continued to use the Matra MS76 V12 engine. However development of the V12 ceased during the year which may have affected the results achieved by the car.  A total of two JS9 chassis were built, with the second of these having revised suspension.

The JS9 was the last Ligier car that used a Matra V12 with the 1979 car being designed around a Cosworth engine.

Racing history
For the 1978 season, Ligier continued to run a single entry for Jacques Laffite, the team's regular driver. After completing the first six races of the season with the JS7 and JS7/9 (a hybrid car), the JS9 made its debut at the Monaco Grand Prix. Laffite qualified it fifteenth on the grid and in the race itself retired with gearbox issues. At the next race in which the JS9 ran, the Spanish Grand Prix, he finished on the podium in third, having qualified tenth. After finishing out of the points for the next three races, he finished third again in Germany, this time from seventh on the grid.

With Laffite now driving the second of the two JS9 chassis that had been built, two further points finishes were achieved, a fifth in Austria (having qualified fifth, the best starting position Lafitte achieved with the JS9) and fourth in Italy. Laffite enjoyed good reliability, retiring from just two races, Monaco and the season ending Canadian Grand Prix.

Complete Formula One World Championship results
(key) (Results in bold indicate pole position; results in italics indicate fastest lap)

* 6 points scored in 1978 were with the JS7 and JS7/9

Notes

References

Ligier JS09